Bruno Nicolai (20 May 1926 – 16 August 1991) was an Italian film music composer, orchestra director and musical editor most active in the 1960s through the 1980s.

While studying piano and composition at the Santa Cecilia Conservatory in Rome, he befriended Ennio Morricone and formed a long working relationship, with Nicolai eventually conducting for and co-scoring films with Morricone. Nicolai also scored a number of giallo exploitation films and wrote many scores for director Jesús Franco.

His work was featured in the Quentin Tarantino films Kill Bill: Volume 2 and Once Upon a Time in Hollywood.

Selected filmography

References

External links 
 
 Bruno Nicolai tribute site

1926 births
1991 deaths
Italian film score composers
Italian male film score composers
Spaghetti Western composers
Accademia Nazionale di Santa Cecilia alumni
Musicians from Rome
20th-century Italian composers
20th-century Italian male musicians